Ptochacarus is a genus of mites in its own family, Ptochacaridae, in the order Mesostigmata.

Species
 Ptochacarus banksi Womersley, 1958
 Ptochacarus daveyi Silvestri, 1911
 Ptochacarus silvestrii Womersley, 1958

References

Mesostigmata